Argentina competed at the 1964 Winter Olympics in Innsbruck, Austria.

Alpine skiing

Men

Men's slalom

Women

Bobsleigh

Luge

Men

References
Official Olympic Reports
 Olympic Winter Games 1964, full results by sports-reference.com

Nations at the 1964 Winter Olympics
1964
1964 in Argentine sport